The 1958 Northern Illinois State Huskies football team represented Northern Illinois University as a member of the Interstate Intercollegiate Athletic Conference (IIAC) during the 1958 NCAA College Division football season. Led by third-year head coach Howard Fletcher, the Huskies compiled an overall record of 4–5 with a mark of 2–4 in conference play, tying for fifth place in the IIAC. The team played home games at the 5,500-seat Glidden Field, located on the east end of campus, in DeKalb, Illinois.

Schedule

References

Northern Illinois
Northern Illinois Huskies football seasons
Northern Illinois Huskies football